John Carty may refer to:

John Carty (Irish politician) (1950–2014), Irish Fianna Fáil politician
John Carty (musician), Irish traditional musician
John J. Carty (1861–1932), American electrical engineer

See also
Jack Carty (disambiguation)